Dan "Danny" Dahill (September 28, 1919 – April 15, 2013) was an American lawyer and legislator.

Born in Glen Jean, West Virginia, Dahill served in the United States Marine Corps during World War II. He graduated from the University of Notre Dame and received his law degree from West Virginia University College of Law. He practiced law in West Logan, West Virginia and was the city attorney. He served in the West Virginia House of Delegates (from 1957–61) and in the State Senate (from 1961–64).

Dahill died in Huntington, West Virginia, aged 93.

References

1919 births
2013 deaths
20th-century American lawyers
Democratic Party members of the West Virginia House of Delegates
People from Fayette County, West Virginia
People from Logan County, West Virginia
University of Notre Dame alumni
West Virginia lawyers
Democratic Party West Virginia state senators
West Virginia University College of Law alumni
West Virginia city attorneys